Per Johan Kinde (14 April 1887 – 1 July 1924) was a Swedish sport shooter who competed in the 1920 Summer Olympics. In 1920 he won the bronze medal as member of the Swedish team in the team clay pigeons competition. Kinde committed suicide by hanging in 1924.

In the 1920 Summer Olympics he also participated in the following events:

 Team running deer, single shots - fourth place
 Individual running deer, single shots - result unknown
 Individual trap - result unknown

References

External links
profile

1887 births
1924 suicides
Swedish male sport shooters
Running target shooters
Olympic shooters of Sweden
Shooters at the 1920 Summer Olympics
Olympic bronze medalists for Sweden
Trap and double trap shooters
Olympic medalists in shooting
Medalists at the 1920 Summer Olympics
Suicides by hanging in Sweden
Sportspeople from Gothenburg
19th-century Swedish people
20th-century Swedish people